Sanna Luostarinen (born 26 October 1976 in Imatra) is a Finnish former actress. Luostarinen has graduated of a commercial institute in the year 1995. She has acted for five years in the Teatteri Violetti in Hyvinkää as well as appeared in television commercials and minor TV-roles.

She is known for the role of Elina Taalasmaa in the Finnish soap series Salatut elämät of MTV3. She played the role from 1999 to 2006 and autumn 2007 to 2008.

Luostarinen gave up acting and retired from public life after leaving Salatut elämät.

References

External links
 

1976 births
Living people
People from Imatra
Finnish actresses